Luca Leovino Martínez Dupuy (born 5 June 2001) is a Mexican professional footballer who plays as a forward for Argentine Primera División club Rosario Central.

Club career
Born in San Luis Potosí, Martínez made his professional debut for Argentine club Rosario Central on 2 November 2020 in the Argentine Primera División against Godoy Cruz.

International career
In October 2020, Martínez received his first national team call up by Raúl Chabrand for the Mexico national under-20 team training camp.

On 9 October 2021, Martínez made his Mexico U21 debut in a friendly match against the Romania U21 side scoring a goal in the minute 47'. On 11 October 2021, Martínez scored in the minute 14 'in a friendly match in which ended as a 2–0 victory against Sweden U21.

Personal life
Martínez is the son of Argentine parents which allows him to play for the Argentina national team as well as the Mexico national team having been born in Mexico.

Career statistics

Club

References

External links

2001 births
Living people
People from San Luis Potosí City
Footballers from San Luis Potosí
Association football forwards
Mexican people of Argentine descent
Sportspeople of Argentine descent
Citizens of Argentina through descent
Argentine footballers
Rosario Central footballers
Argentine Primera División players
Mexican footballers